Arnold Büscher (16 December 1899 – 2 August 1949) was a German SS officer. Holding the rank of SS-Obersturmführer, he served as a commandant of the Kraków-Płaszów concentration camp, succeeding Amon Göth, from September 1944 until January 1945.

Life 
Büscher was born on 16 December 1899 in Bad Oeynhausen, Germany.

Büscher became a member of the Schutzstaffel (SS) in 1931. After the outbreak of the Second World War, he worked at many Nazi concentration camps, including Flossenbürg, Buchenwald, Sachsenhausen and Neuengamme.

Büscher succeeded Amon Göth as the commandant of the Płaszów concentration camp after the latter was arrested on 13 September 1944. Büscher resisted Oskar Schindler's efforts to include 300 Jewish women on his list of Schindlerjuden for work at Schindler's new factory in Brněnec, instead sending them with other Jews from Płaszów to Auschwitz I. Furthermore, Büscher, perhaps out of spite for Schindler, requested of Auschwitz I commandant Richard Baer that 300 different Jewish women be sent to Schindler's factory. However, Schindler was able to bribe Baer to send him the original 300 female Schindlerjuden.

On 23 January 1948, Büscher was sentenced to death in Poland for his crimes at Płaszów. He was executed by hanging on 2 August 1949.

References

1899 births
1949 deaths
SS-Obersturmführer
People from Bad Oeynhausen
Flossenbürg concentration camp personnel
Buchenwald concentration camp personnel
Sachsenhausen concentration camp personnel
Neuengamme concentration camp personnel
Kraków-Płaszów concentration camp personnel
Executed Nazi concentration camp commandants
Nazis executed by Poland by hanging
Oskar Schindler